The Faculty of Engineering, Alexandria University was established in 1942.

History 
At the beginning of the academic year 1941–1942, the Faculty of Engineering of King Fuad I University established a branch in Alexandria for the preparatory year study. In 1942, Farouk I University was established in Alexandria, and the branch of the faculty of Engineering became the Faculty of Engineering in King Farouk I University. The study in the preparatory year and the first year started simultaneously in the academic year 1942–1943; the study started in the departments of Architecture, Civil Engineering, Mechanical Engineering and Electrical Engineering. In 1946, the Department of Sanitary Engineering and Municipalities was established. The Departments of Civil Engineering and Electrical Engineering were developed over the years. In 1953, the Institute of Industrial Chemistry which was affiliated to the Faculty of Science, became one of the departments of the Faculty of Engineering as the Chemical Engineering Department, from which the first class was graduated in 1954. The Departments of Nuclear Engineering and Computer and Automatic Control were established in 1964 and 1974 respectively.
 In 1941 The Faculty of Engineering – Cairo University established its branch in Alexandria.
 1942 The emanation of law ordinance No. 32 for the year 1942 for founding Alexandria University.
 1942 The inception of the education in of the preparatory year and the first year (Architecture, Civil Engineering, Electrical and Mechanical Engineering)
 1946 Establishing the department of Sanitary Engineering and Municipalities.
 1953 Establishing the department of Chemical Engineering
 1960 Establishing the departments of Mechanical Power Engineering, and Weaving & Textile Engineering.
 1961 Establishing the department of Marine Engineering.
 1963 Establishing the department of Production Engineering.
 1964 Establishing the department of Nuclear Engineering.
 1974 Establishing the department of Computer and Automatic Control.
 2006 Adopting Specialized Scientific Programs (S.S.P) using Credit hours system.

Campus 
The Faculty is located in the middle of the city of Alexandria.
The building are:
 Administration building
 Preparatory building
 Mechanical departments building
 Textile Engineering building
 Production workshop
 Electrical Engineering workshop
 Electrical departments building
 The clinic building
 Student Activity building
 SSP building

The Campus also includes a football ground, a tennis court and a volleyball/basketball combined field.

Undergraduate 
The Faculty follows the credit hours system per academic year. The duration of study to obtain a Bachelor of Engineering (B.Eng.) degree is five academic years (a preparatory year, followed by four academic years). Each semester runs for 15 weeks.

Credit hours system 
The Faculty of Engineering, Alexandria University has developed a curriculum to upgrade the Graduate Studies and Research based on credit hours system, to provide advanced academic programs to match the development of different fields and to enhance scientific experience to support the rapid pace of development worldwide.
It consists of a three-semester system
The Fall Semester (First Semester): Starts on the Third Saturday of September and Lasts for 15 weeks.
Spring Semester (Second Semester): Starts on the Second Saturday of February and Lasts for 15 weeks.
Summer Semester (Third Semester): Starts on the First Saturday of July and Lasts for 8 Weeks.
 Postgraduate
 The student is allowed to register 12 credit hours per regular semester and 6 credit hours in the summer semester. Full-time students are allowed to register a maximum of 18 credit hours per regular semester and 9 credit hours in the summer semester.
 Specialized Scientific Programs (SSP)
 The student is allowed to register 20 credit hours per regular semester and 6 credit hours in the summer semester. For emergency cases students are allowed to register a maximum of 22 credit hours per regular semester and 9 credit hours in the summer semester.

Academic departments 
 Architectural Engineering Department.
 Chemical Engineering Department.
 Electrical Engineering Departments:
Electrical Power Engineering & Machines Department.
Electronics Engineering & Communications Department.
Computer and Systems Engineering Department.
 Engineering Mathematics and Physics Department.  (Preparatory Stage)
 Irrigation Engineering And Hydraulics Department.
 Marine Engineering And Naval Architecture Department.
 Mechanical Engineering Department.
 Nuclear and Radiation Engineering Department.
 Production Engineering Department.
 Sanitary Engineering Department.
 Structural Engineering Department.
 Textile Engineering Department.
 Transportation Engineering Department.

Specialized scientific programs (S.S.P) 
The Faculty Of Engineering introduces eight Specialized Scientific Programs using the Course credit system and Grade Point Average (GPA) for the first time in the Faculty. These programs are:
 Gas And Petrochemicals Engineering.
 Electromechanical Engineering.
 Computer and Communications Engineering.
 Architecture and Construction Engineering.
 Civil and Environmental  Engineering.
 Mechatronics and Robotics Engineering.
 Materials Science and Engineering.
 Biomedical Engineering.

Postgraduate 
Similar to the SSP the postgraduate programs follow the credit hours system. The Faculty offers the following post-graduate degrees:
 The Technical Diploma.
 Postgraduate diploma.
 Master's degree.
 Master of Science.
 Doctor of Philosophy.

Special units 
The Faculty of Engineering has 3 Special Units that are involved in supporting the Faculty and Alexandria University with their facilities:
 The Engineering Center,
 The Scientific Computation Center
 The Production Unit
 Quality Control Center

Notable alumni 
 Yahya El Mashad Egyptian nuclear physicist
 Hassaballah El Kafrawy Former Minister of Development, Reconstruction, Housing, New Communities, Public Utilities and Land Reclamation (1977–1993).
 Mohamed Hashish Egyptian research scientist best known as the father of the abrasive water jet cutter.
 Mohamed Abdou Egyptian nuclear Engineer.
 Rasheed Mohamed Rasheed Former Egyptian Minister of Industry and foreign trade
 Azer Bestavros Warren Distinguished Professor of Computer Science at Boston University, best known for his work on web push caching for Content Distribution Networks
 Moustafa Youssef Egyptian Computer Scientist and Engineer. First and only ACM Fellow in the Middle East and Africa.
 Adel Elmaghraby Winnia Distinguished Professor of Computer Science and Engineering and Director of Industrial Research and Innovation at the University of Louisville, best known for his contributions to Artificial Intelligence and Simulation in addition to Cybersecurity Education.

See also 
 List of Engineering Faculties in Egypt
 Alexandria University
 Educational institutions in Alexandria
 Engineering
 Course credit

References

External links 
 

Alexandria University
1942 establishments in Egypt